Phyllophaga marginalis is a species of scarab beetle in the family Scarabaeidae. It is found in North America.

Subspecies
These two subspecies belong to the species Phyllophaga marginalis:
 Phyllophaga marginalis insolita Cartwright, 1944
 Phyllophaga marginalis marginalis (LeConte, 1856)

References

Further reading

 

Melolonthinae
Articles created by Qbugbot
Beetles described in 1856
Taxa named by John Lawrence LeConte